Freddy Alexander Ferragut González (born 2 September 1974) is a Chilean former professional footballer who played as a midfielder and current manager.

Club career
A product of Colo-Colo youth system, he made his debut in 1991 at the age of 17. He was loaned to Magallanes and Santiago Wanderers in 1993 and 1996 respectively. Next, he had a step with Mexican club Real Sociedad de Zacatecas, where he promoted the signing of the Chilean player Victor Mella with the club. 

He returned to Colo-Colo in 1999 and next he moved to the United States to play for amateur clubs. His last club was Deportes Melipilla in 2005, where made 12 appearances and scored one goal.

International career
Ferragut represented Chile at under-17 level in the 1991 South American Championship and at under-20 level in both the 1992 South American Championship and the 1993 L'Alcúdia Tournament, becoming the MVP player.

At under-23 level, he took part of the Chile squad in the 1995 Pan American Games.

Coaching career
Parallel to his last days as a football player and following his retirement, since 2003 he has worked as coach in American soccer academies such as Stanford Soccer Club, Burlingame Soccer Club, Gunn High School and Woodside Soccer Club. 

In 2017 he began to work in his native country by joining Municipal Santiago in the Tercera B, moving to Deportivo Pilmahue in the same season. He returned to Pilmahue in 2021. From 2018 to 2019 he was the coach of San Antonio Unido in the Segunda División Profesional.

Honours

Club
Colo-Colo
 Chilean Primera División: 1994

Individual
 L'Alcúdia International Tournament MVP Player: 1993

References

External links
 
 
 Freddy Ferragut at PlaymakerStats

1974 births
Living people
Footballers from Santiago
Chilean footballers
Chilean expatriate footballers
Chile youth international footballers
Chile under-20 international footballers
Colo-Colo footballers
Deportes Magallanes footballers
Magallanes footballers
Santiago Wanderers footballers
Real Sociedad de Zacatecas footballers
Deportes Melipilla footballers
Chilean Primera División players
Primera B de Chile players
Ascenso MX players
Association football forwards
Chilean football managers
Chilean expatriate football managers
Segunda División Profesional de Chile managers
Chilean expatriate sportspeople in Mexico
Chilean expatriate sportspeople in the United States
Expatriate footballers in Mexico
Expatriate soccer players in the United States
Expatriate soccer managers in the United States